Paopi 15 - Coptic Calendar - Paopi 17

The sixteenth day of the Coptic month of Paopi, the second month of the Coptic year. On a common year, this day corresponds to October 13, of the Julian Calendar, and October 26, of the Gregorian Calendar. This day falls in the Coptic season of Peret, the season of emergence.

Commemorations

Saints 

 The departure of Pope Agathon, the thirty-ninth Patriarch of the See of Saint Mark 
 The departure of Saint Carpus, Saint Apollo, and Saint Peter

References 

Days of the Coptic calendar